Aniversario is a professional wrestling card that is held annually by Puerto Rican promotion World Wrestling Council (WWC) to commemorate its anniversary. The first show was held in 1983 to mark the tenth anniversary of WWC's creation in 1973. Various WWC championships are defending at the event, and the 1986 event featured two defenses of the National Wrestling Alliance's NWA World Heavyweight Championship. The show has also been dedicated to various former professional wrestlers and personalities including Bruiser Brody in 2007 and Hugo Savinovich in 2009. In 2017, WWC did not held the Aniversario show due to the path of Hurricane Maria through Puerto Rico.

1983

1984

1985

1986

It took place in three venues:
Round 1: Ponce, Puerto Rico at Juan Pachin Vicens Auditorium, drawing 9,500
Round 2: Mayaguez, Puerto Rico at the Isidoro Garcia Stadium, drawing 9,500
Round 3: San Juan, Puerto Rico at Hiram Bithorn Stadium, drawing 23,000

September 20

September 21

1987

1988

1989
Aniversario 1989 is well known for having various changes and was postponed following the aftermath of Hurricane Hugo

1990

1991

1992

1993

1994

1995

1996

1997

1998

1999

2000

2001

The 2001 event was nicknamed "Black September (Septiembre Negro)".

2002

2003

2004

2005

This event was dedicated to WWC legend Isaac Rosario.

2006

This event was dedicated to Jose Rivera, Sr.

2007

The 2007 show was dedicated to Bruiser Brody. It consisted of two events. The first event took place at Coliseo de Puerto Rico José Miguel Agrelot in San Juan, Puerto Rico. The second event was held the following day at the Sports and Recreation Palace in Mayagüez, Puerto Rico.

2008

The event also featured a retirement ceremony of Carlos Colón, which featured Chicky Starr, Harley Race, Jose Rivera, Sr. and Abdullah the Butcher.

2009
The event was dedicated to former WWC and WWE announcer Hugo Savinovich, which featured Carlos Cabrera, Carlos Colon, and Joe Don Smith

2010

This event was dedicated to the memory of Pedro Huracan Castillo. The event was celebrated in Coliseo Ruben Rodriguez at Bayamon, also two other shows were celebrated in Aguadilla and Ponce before the main night in Bayamon. Tommy Dreamer and Daizee Haze were present in Ponce & Aguadilla.

2011

This event was dedicated to former WWC Universal Champion Hercules Ayala. This event was the start of an invasion angle of IWA (rival promotion) which soon after was cancelled:

2012

This event was dedicated to The Invaders, Jose Huertas (1), Roberto Soto (2), Johnny Rivera (3) and Maelo Huertas(4). The event was held at Coliseo Ruben Rodriguez in Bayamon.

2013
This event was dedicated to former WWWF (WWE) World Heavyweight Champion Pedro Morales. The event was held at Coliseo Rubén Rodríguez in Bayamón. This was a pay-per-view event.

2014
This event was dedicated to Chicky Starr. The event was held at Coliseo Héctor Sola Bezares in Caguas, Puerto Rico. This was a pay-per-view event.

2015 
The event was dedicated to Jose Miguel Perez Sr., The event was held at Coliseo Ruben Rodríguez in Bayamon, Puerto Rico.

2016 
The event was dedicated posthumously to former Canadian professional wrestler and WWC wrestler Pierre Martel. The event was held at: Humacao Arena (October 14), Cancha Jose Pepin Cesteros in Bayamon (October 15), Palacio de Recreación y Deportes in Mayaguez (October 16)

October 15 (Cancha Jose Pepin Cesteros de Bayamon)

2017 
The World Wrestling Council did not held the WWC Aniversario in 2017 due to the wake of Hurricane María thru Puerto Rico.

2018

July 14 (Cancha Mario Quijote Morales, Guaynabo, Puerto Rico)

2019
August 17 (Cancha Mario Quijote Morales, Guaynabo, Puerto Rico). The event was dedicated to former WWC Universal Champion Dutch Mantell

2022
WWC Aniversario 49 was held on August 6, 2022 after the was event was cancelled for two years due to COVID-19 restrictions. The event took place at Coliseo Rubén Rodríguez in Bayamón and was dedicated to Huracan Castillo Jr.

2023
This edition of the annual WWC Aniversario show will mark the 50th aniversary of the World Wrestling Council. The event will be held on June 24, 2013, at Coliseo Rubén Rodríguez in Bayamón Puerto Rico. It will dedicated to Carlos Colón, Victor Jovica, Gorilla Monsoon, Gil Hayes, Miguel Pérez, Huracan Castillo Sr., Joaquin Padín, hijo, Rickin Sánchez and the puertorrican fans.

References
General
Magazine Wrestling's Main Event January 1985
Specific

Professional wrestling shows
Professional wrestling in Puerto Rico
1983 in professional wrestling
World Wrestling Council
Professional wrestling anniversary shows